Tautavel is a commune in the Pyrénées-Orientales department in southern France.

It is home to The European Centre for Prehistoric Research (CERP). Tautavel Man, an early hominid and some of the oldest human remains in Europe, was found in Caune de l'Arago, a cave in the commune.

Geography 
Tautavel is located in the canton of La Vallée de l'Agly and in the arrondissement of Perpignan.

Population

See also
Communes of the Pyrénées-Orientales department

References

External links 

 
CERP website

Communes of Pyrénées-Orientales
Paleoanthropological sites
Stone Age sites in Europe
Homo erectus sites